Thomas Toth is a Canadian long-distance runner from Lakefield, Ontario who now lives in Plaistow, New Hampshire.

College career
He competed for Cameron University where he earned All-Conference, All Region, All-American honors, along with winning the LSC Conference Championship.

International career
He competed at the 2017 IAAF World Cross Country Championships, finishing in 105th place in Kampala, Uganda.

Toth debuted at a half marathon in Houston, Texas in January 2016. In his debut Toth managed a 64:26 to qualify for the world half marathon championships to take place in Cardiff, Wales, the 9th fastest in Canadian history.

Toth holds a qualifying time for the 2017 World Championships in Athletics.

He went on to place 54th at the world championships in England and placed as the top Canadian.

Toth won his first national title at the half marathon distance in only his second attempt at 21.1 km.

References

External links
 

Date of birth missing (living people)
Living people
Canadian male long-distance runners
Canadian male marathon runners
Cameron Aggies men's track and field athletes
People from Peterborough County
People from Plaistow, New Hampshire
Sportspeople from Rockingham County, New Hampshire
Track and field athletes from Ontario